Frank Irving Bailey Jr. (born August 3, 1936) was an American politician. He was a member of the Georgia House of Representatives from 1972 to 1976, 1983 to 1990, and 1993 to 2000. He was a member of the Democratic party.

References

Living people
Democratic Party members of the Georgia House of Representatives
1936 births
Politicians from Augusta, Georgia